Strange Brigade is a cooperative third-person shooter video game developed and published by Rebellion Developments. It was released for Microsoft Windows, PlayStation 4 and Xbox One on August 28, 2018, on August 1, 2020 for Stadia, and on June 15, 2021 for Nintendo Switch. In the game, the player fights against different mythological enemies and solves puzzles.

Gameplay
Strange Brigade is a third-person shooter with a huge emphasis on cooperative gameplay. In the game, the player assumes the role of an adventurer in the 1930s and can team up with three other players to fight against different mythological enemies like mummies, giant scorpions and minotaurs. The game's four playable characters, who can be customized, have different weapons and abilities. Players have a large arsenal of weapons at their disposal. Each weapon has several upgrade slots, which can be used to enhance combat efficiency. Players can switch and upgrade their weapons at the workbenches found in a level. They can also activate different traps, such as spinning blades and spikes, to kill enemies.

The game features branching levels which encourage exploration. By solving puzzles, players will discover new relics which can unlock "amulet powers". These powerful amulet powers can be activated by absorbing the souls of enemies. Players can also find treasure chests to unlock powerful prototype weapons, and collect gold coins to purchase new weapons.

Premise
The Strange Brigade, a group of Secret Service agents sent by the British colonial government, has infiltrated archaeologist Edgar Harbin's expedition in an effort to eliminate Seteki, a brutal and barbaric queen who once ruled the Sahara Africa.

Development
The game was developed by Rebellion Developments. The gameplay was inspired by cooperative games such as Left 4 Dead and Rebellion's own Zombie Army Trilogy, while the story and the game's tone were inspired by the adventure serials released in the 1930s. Announced on June 7, 2017, the game was released on August 28, 2018. Players who pre-ordered the game were given access to the "Secret Service Weapons" pack, while those who purchased the Digital Deluxe edition have access to the game's season pass and other post-launch content for free. There is also a Collector's Edition which contains physical items such as an airship model and an artbook.

Reception
According to review aggregator Metacritic, the PC and PlayStation 4 versions received mixed to positive reviews while the Xbox One version received generally positive reviews from critics.

In December 2018, Strange Brigade was featured as one of The Telegraphs "50 best games of 2018".

Awards

References

External links 
 

2018 video games
Action video games
Alternate history video games
Multiplayer and single-player video games
Fiction about mummies
Nintendo Switch games
PlayStation 4 games
Rebellion Developments games
Third-person shooters
Video games developed in the United Kingdom
Video games set in Egypt
Windows games
Xbox One games
Stadia games